Carlton Thomas is a Belizean footballer who currently plays for Police United in the Premier League of Belize and the Belize national team.

International career 
Thomas made his national team debut for Belize on 26 March 2015 in a 0–0 draw against Cayman Islands.

References 

1994 births
Living people
Belizean footballers
Belize international footballers
Premier League of Belize players
Association football forwards
Police United FC (Belize) players
Belize Defence Force FC players